Ivan Barnev (born 15 July 1973) is a Bulgarian actor. He is best known for his performance as Jan Dítě in I Served the King of England (2006), as well as his frequent collaborations with filmmakers Kristina Grozeva and Petar Valchanov in films such as The Lesson (2014), The Father (2019) and Triumph.

Career
Barnev was born in 1973 in Dobrich, and grew up in Varna. He studied at the National Academy for Theatre and Film Arts, initially majoring in drama, before moving to Stefan Danailov's pantomime class and graduating in 1996.

Barnev began his career in theater, and won an Askeer Award for Rising Star for his performance in Dinner of Fools in 2002. In 2011, he won an Askeer Award for Best Actor for his role as Billy Bibbit in One Flew Over the Cuckoo's Nest.

On screen, Barnev has starred in the historical comedy I Served the King of England (2006), the adventure film Sneakers (2011), and the drama films Footsteps in the Sand (2010), The Lesson (2014), Directions (2017) and The Father (2019).

In 2022, Barnev starred in the Spanish-Bulgarian comedy-drama film Vasil, for which he received the award for Best Actor at the Valladolid International Film Festival together with his screen partner Karra Elejalde.

Acting credits

Film

Stage
 Dinner of Fools (2001)
 One Flew Over the Cuckoo's Nest (2011)

References

External links

 
 

1973 births
Living people
Bulgarian male film actors
Bulgarian male stage actors
People from Dobrich
Actors from Varna, Bulgaria
National Academy for Theatre and Film Arts alumni